The 2013 European Road Championships were held in Olomouc, Czech Republic, between 18 and 21 July 2013. The event consisted of a road race and a time trial for men and women under 23 and juniors. The championships were regulated by the European Cycling Union.

Schedule

Individual time trial
Thursday 18 July 2013
 11:00 Men Juniors, 22 km
 15:30 Women under-23, 22 km

Friday 19 July 2013
 11:00 Women Juniors, 18 km
 Men under-23, 34 km

Road race
Saturday 20 July 2013
 9:30 Men Juniors, 126 km
 13:30 Women under-23, 126 km

Sunday 21 July 2013
 10:00 Men under-23, 165 km
 15:00 Women Juniors, 75 km

Events summary

Medal table

References

External links

 

 
European Road Championships, 2013
Road cycling
Cycling
2013 in men's road cycling
2013 in women's road cycling
European Road Championships by year
Sport in Olomouc
July 2013 sports events in Europe